The men's singles badminton event at the 2019 Pan American Games will be held from July 29 – August 2nd at the Polideportivo 3 in Lima, Peru. The defending Pan American Games champion is Kevin Cordón of Guatemala.

Each National Olympic Committee could enter a maximum of three athletes into the competition. The athletes will be drawn into an elimination stage draw. Once an athlete lost a match, they will be no longer able to compete. Each match will be contested as the best of three games.

Seeds
The following athletes were seeded:

    (champion)
   (semifinals)
   (semifinals)
   (quarterfinals)
  (final)
 (quarterfinals)
  (quarterfinals)
   (second round)

Results

Finals

Top Half

Section 1

Section 2

Bottom Half

Section 3

Section 4

References

External links
Tournament software results

Men's singles